is a former Japanese football player.

Playing career
Okada was born in Gunma Prefecture on December 30, 1978. After graduating from high school, he joined Japan Football League club Consadole Sapporo in 1997. Although he could hardly play in the match in 1997, the club won the 2nd place and was promoted to J1 League from 1998. In 1998, he could not play at all in the match and the club was relegated to J2 League from 1999. In 1999, he played only one match in Emperor's Cup and retired end of 1999 season.

Club statistics

References

External links

1978 births
Living people
Association football people from Gunma Prefecture
Japanese footballers
J1 League players
J2 League players
Japan Football League (1992–1998) players
Hokkaido Consadole Sapporo players
Association football midfielders